MJA InSight is a newsletter for medical professionals produced by the Medical Journal of Australia (MJA). Articles are written primarily by doctors. An overview is provided each week by its medical editor, Dr. Ruth Armstrong. It has the largest medical-newsletter subscription membership in Australia.

MJA InSight is published by the Australasian Medical Publishing Company, the publishers of the Medical Journal of Australia. The newsletter informs clinicians of key developments and research in medicine and health.

References

Professional and trade magazines